Santa María Department may refer to:
 Santa María Department, Catamarca, in Argentina
 Santa María Department, Córdoba, in Argentina